Before I Die is an upcoming British film in Bangla & English language. This film is a Collaboration between UK, Bangladesh, India & Bulgaria. This is a Martial arts thriller film directed by Minhaj Kibriyah, starring Ifte Amed and Affri Selina in the lead roles. The principal photography of the film began on 25 December 2019 and the film will have a simultaneous release in Bangladesh, USA, UK, and India.

It is actor Ifte Amed's first leading role in a feature film.

Summary 

Before I Die tells the story of a highly skilled dehumanized assassin, who has an emotional and spiritual awakening. Then becomes a savior of a nation.

Cast 
Ifte Amed	as Roy
Affri Selina as Joya
Amaan Reza as Danny Shah  
Shimul Khan as 		
Laboni Marma as Monica
Shanku Panja as Sultan Gazi
Shampa Reza as Helen

Production 
Minhaj Kibriyah, director of films like Surinagar and Shotorupe Shotobar decided to make a Bangla Martial arts film matching International standards. The film was announced as Before I Die. Bangladeshi actor Amaan Reza joined the film as executive producer. The production team focused in Ifte Amed, a professional critic award winning British actor of Bangladeshi origin. Ifte Amed was a professional footballer for Sporting Bengal United F.C. and winner of first Mr Asia UK modelling contest as the leading man. Actress Shampa Reza and Laboni Marma joined the cast later. Actress Affri Selina was signed as the leading lady of the film Action director Abjol Miah integrated Filippino fight action combat in the movie for which, actor Ifte Amed had to undergo training for more than one and a half years under Abjol Miah. The film was shot at different locations of London, Sylhet, Dhaka and Comilla, with the pack up announcing on 15 November 2021 and the post production was done in Bollywood Mumbai. This was a collaboration teamwork by creatives in UK, Bangladesh, India & Bulgaria. The world premiere of the film was held at London Genesis Cinema on 10 July 2022, attended by personalities like Dabirul Islam and Anwar Choudhury.

Soundtrack

References

External links
 

Films shot in Dhaka
Films shot in London
2022 films
2022 thriller films
Bangladeshi thriller films